"It's Over" is a 1987 song by the British band Level 42. Released as the fourth single from their album Running in the Family, it reached #10 in the UK Singles Chart (becoming the band's sixth and final UK Top 10 hit).

Release
In addition to the regular 7" single, two 12" singles were released with different track listings. A limited edition 7" single pack was also released, including four photo postcards (of the band members) taken from the video location shoot, and four Level 42 logo stickers. A CD Video single (CD-V) was also released in 1988.

While the album version sounds very similar to the 12" remix, the latter has a more defined "cold" end.

Music video
The music video for "It's Over" was shot in the Mammoth Lakes area of north-eastern California near the state border with Nevada.

Track listing
UK (Polydor; POSP 900 / 885 965-7) 7" single
It's Over (Remix) - 4:45
Physical Presence (Live) - 5:45

UK (Polydor; POSPX 900 / 885 965-1) 12" single
It's Over (Extended Remix) – 6:00
Physical Presence (Live) – 5:45
It's Over (instrumental) – 4:45

UK (Polydor; POSPA 900 / 887 055-1) alt. 12" single
It's Over (Extended Remix) – 6:00
Physical Presence (Live) – 5:45
Running In The Family (Dave "O" Remix) – 6:37

UK (Polydor; 080 156-2) CD Video (1988)
Audio
It's Over - Extended Remix – 5:59
Running In The Family - Dave "O" Remix – 6:34
Physical Presence (Live) – 5:43
Video
It's Over – 4:38

Charts

Weekly charts

Year-end charts

References

External links
 Level 42 official website

1987 singles
Level 42 songs
1987 songs
Songs written by Mark King (musician)
Songs written by Wally Badarou
Songs written by Boon Gould
Polydor Records singles
Pop ballads